The Latakia offensive refer to a series of battles to take control of the Latakia Governorate during the Syrian Civil War:
2013 Latakia offensive: A failed rebel offensive launched in August 2013 to capture the Latakia Governorate from Government forces.
2014 Latakia offensive: The second rebel offensive in the Latakia Governorate launched on 21 March 2014 by rebel Islamist groups including Al-Nusra Front.
2015–16 Latakia offensive: A Syrian Government offensive launched in November 2015 to capture rebel-held territory bordering Turkey.
2016 Latakia offensive: A failed rebel counter-offensive launched in June 2016 to seize the territory previously lost in the 2015–16 offensive.

Military operations of the Syrian civil war in 2013
Military operations of the Syrian civil war in 2014
Military operations of the Syrian civil war in 2015